Allophyes oxyacanthae, the green-brindled crescent, is a moth of the family Noctuidae. The species was first described by Carl Linnaeus in his landmark 1758 10th edition of Systema Naturae. It is found in Europe.

Technical description and variation

M. oxyacanthae L. (31 g). Forewing reddish grey, varied with fuscous; the nervures and inner margin lined with green scales; a strong black streak from base below cell; lines finely black, the inner sharply angled outwards at the end of the basal streak, the outer marked with a bright white crescent on submedian fold; stigmata all large, pale pinky brown, outlined with black; a diffuse black shade to termen below vein 2; submarginal line faintly paler, the area before it generally paler; hindwing luteous whitish in male, grey in female. The form found in Syria, benedictina Stgr. (31 g) [now full species Allophyes benedictina (Staudinger, [1892]) ]has the forewings dark grey brown; the hindwings paler; but those of the female are darker grey; — another form, occurring in Pontus, Palestine and Ussuriland, asiatica Stgr.[ now full species Allophyes asiatica (Staudinger, [1892]) has the fore-wings pale grey; capucina Mill. (31 g h) is a form restricted, apparently, to the British Isles, rich deep brown with darker shading in the male, darker duller brown in the female, with the lines and markings distinct, the hindwings of the male often rufous-tinged; in this the green scaling is altogether absent; — corsica Spul. [now full species Allophyes corsica (Spuler, 1905)] from the Island of Corsica is said to be paler, of a more vivid yellowish red colour; — pallida Tutt, from Ireland and Berkshire, has pale reddish grey forewings, with only a slight amount of green along inner and outer margins. Larva dull slaty grey or brownish grey, covered with irregular-shaped black marks; on each side of segment 4, which is slightly raised, an oblique dark streak; tubercles pale on dark spots; spiracles fine, white, with black rings. The wingspan is 35–45 mm.

Biology
The moth flies from September to November, depending on the location.

The larvae feed on Crataegus, Prunus spinosa, birch and various fruit bearing trees.

Gallery

References

External links

Fauna Europaea

"09682 Allophyes oxyacanthae (Linnaeus, 1758) - Weißdorneule". Lepiforum e. V. Retrieved January 22, 2021. 
[https://www.vlinderstichting.nl/vlinders/overzicht-vlinders/details-vlinder/meidoornuil "Meidoornuil
Allophyes oxyacanthae"]. De Vlinderstichting. Retrieved January 22, 2021. 

Cuculliinae
Moths described in 1758
Moths of Europe
Taxa named by Carl Linnaeus